Pedobacter africanus is a species of heparinase-producing bacteria.

References

Further reading
Whitman, William B., et al., eds. Bergey's manual® of systematic bacteriology. Vol. 5. Springer, 2012.

External links

LPSN
Type strain of Pedobacter africanus at BacDive -  the Bacterial Diversity Metadatabase

Sphingobacteriia
Bacteria described in 1998